The Opitutales is an order in the phylum Verrucomicrobiota.

References

Verrucomicrobiota
Bacteria orders